Mylothris hilara, the hilara dotted border, is a butterfly in the family Pieridae. It is found in Guinea, Ivory Coast, Nigeria, Cameroon, Equatorial Guinea, the Republic of the Congo, the Democratic Republic of the Congo, Uganda and Kenya. The habitat consists of submontane forests and lowland forests.

Subspecies
Mylothris hilara hilara (Guinea, Ivory Coast, Nigeria, Cameroon)
Mylothris hilara furvus Bernardi, 1953  (Equatorial Guinea: Bioko)
Mylothris hilara goma Berger, 1981 (Cameroon, Equatorial Guinea, Congo, Democratic Republic of the Congo, Uganda, western Kenya)

References

Seitz, A. Die Gross-Schmetterlinge der Erde 13: Die Afrikanischen Tagfalter. Plate XIII 10

Butterflies described in 1892
Pierini
Butterflies of Africa